Megalobulimus cardosoi is an extinct species of air-breathing land snail, a terrestrial gastropod mollusk in the family Strophocheilidae. This species was endemic to Brazil.

References 

cardosoi
Extinct gastropods
Endemic fauna of Brazil
Extinct animals of Brazil
Gastropods described in 1952
Taxonomy articles created by Polbot